Fabio Morandini (born 17 December 1945) is an Italian skier. He competed in the Nordic combined at the 1968 Winter Olympics and the 1972 Winter Olympics.

References

External links
 

1945 births
Living people
Italian male Nordic combined skiers
Olympic Nordic combined skiers of Italy
Nordic combined skiers at the 1968 Winter Olympics
Nordic combined skiers at the 1972 Winter Olympics
Sportspeople from Trentino